Guerra de Escuelas (Spanish for "War of the Schools") was an annual professional wrestling major event produced by Mexican professional wrestling promotion International Wrestling Revolution Group (IWRG), which took place on May 5, 2015 in Arena Naucalpan, Naucalpan, State of Mexico, Mexico. The focal point of the event was an ongoing storyline rivalry between IWRG's wrestling school led by their teacher Black Terry and the Gym Eterno wrestling school led by Eterno and was an extension of the personal feud between Black Terry and Eterno. The undercard featured several matches with wrestling students from other schools such as Gym Hip Hop Man, Gym Skayde and Gym Zeus led by Hip Hop Man, Skayde and Oficial 911.

Storylines
The event featured five professional wrestling matches with different wrestlers involved in pre-existing scripted feuds, plots and storylines. Wrestlers were portrayed as either heels (referred to as rudos in Mexico, those that portray the "bad guys") or faces (técnicos in Mexico, the "good guy" characters) as they followed a series of tension-building events, which culminated in a wrestling match or series of matches. IWRG often promotes shows to promote wrestlers who train at IWRG's wrestling school Futuro Idolos de Lucha Libre (FILL) and has on several occasions held a Torneo FILL where students from IWRG's school has faced off against students from rival schools. The Guerra de Escuelas was a major show held by IWRG centering on a storyline between the main FILL trainer, Black Terry and the main Gym Eterno trainer, Eterno, which had started months earlier after Eterno claimed to be a much better trainer than Black Terry.

Results

References

External links 
 

2015 in professional wrestling
International Wrestling Revolution Group shows
2015 in Mexico